Skydiggers are a Canadian roots rock band from Toronto formed by Andy Maize and Josh Finlayson. Since 1990, they have released 19 albums/EPs and have had a number of singles that have appeared on the Canadian charts. Their most successful album is Restless, released in 1992. With a presence spanning decades, the band has appeared under a variety of different record labels and with many changes in members that form the group. The current group of six members released their most recent recording in 2017.

Biography
The band was originally formed by singer Andy Maize, previously of Direktive 17, and lead guitarist Josh Finlayson, formerly of The Ramblers, as a duo called West Montrose. The band later added rhythm guitarist and singer-songwriter Peter Cash, drummer Wayne Stokes and bassist Ron Macey to their lineup after becoming regular performers at Acoustic Meltdown, a weekly concert series at Toronto's Spadina Hotel organized by Cash's brother, singer-songwriter Andrew Cash. The expanded line up settled on the name Skydiggers, a name which Andrew Cash had previously considered for his own band.

In 1989, the band became the first Canadian signing to Enigma Records, who released their self-titled debut album the following year. It spawned the singles "Monday Morning" and "I Will Give You Everything". However, the label soon went bankrupt, and the album was never properly promoted.

Some of Enigma's Canadian staff created FRE Records in 1992, and released the band's second (and most popular) album, Restless, that year. At the same time, Stokes left the band. Drummers Mike Sloski and Steve Pitkin filled in on drums until the band recruited Joel Anderson as its new permanent drummer. "A Penny More", the lead single from Restless, became the band's biggest hit, produced by John Oliveira and the band at Hamilton's Grant Avenue Studios.

Capitol Records, the distributor for both Enigma and FRE, also rereleased the band's debut album that year.

In 1993, the band's third album, Just Over This Mountain, was released. It consolidated the band's status by winning a number of music awards, including the Juno Award for Most Promising Group. Following that album, Anderson left the band and was replaced by Peter von Althen.

In 1995, the band signed to Warner Canada and released Road Radio. However, at this time, FRE went bankrupt, meaning that the band's earlier albums were no longer widely available. After the tour to support that album, Cash left the band. He was replaced by Paul MacLeod. The band subsequently left Warner, after which von Althen also left the band.

Since the band's sound had largely been defined by Maize and Cash's vocal harmonies, the band revised their sound somewhat for 1997's Desmond's Hip City, released on DROG Records. The title track had an almost trip hop feel, and some other songs (notably "November in Ontario" and "The Shape of Things to Come") were closer to hard rock than anything the band had previously recorded.

In 1999, the band performed at the 1999 Stardust Picnic festival at Historic Fort York, Toronto. With Restless, their most popular album, still unavailable in stores due to legal uncertainties around FRE's bankruptcy, they decided that their next studio project would be to assemble a new version of that album using old rehearsal recordings. Still Restless: The Lost Tapes was released that year.

In 2000, the band released the live album There and Back Again, followed in 2003 by Bittersweet Harmony.

In 2006, they teamed up with The Cash Brothers (former Skydigger Peter Cash and his brother Andrew) to release, Skydiggers/Cash Brothers, an acoustic album. In 2008 they released City of Sirens, followed by the compilationThe Truth About Us in 2009.

The band returned in 2012 when they released Northern Shore through MapleMusic Recordings. In 2013, the band released No. 1 Northern, an album of cover versions of songs by Canadian songwriters, including Neil Young, Gordon Lightfoot, Ron Sexsmith, Gene MacLellan, Linda McRae, Charlie Angus and Andrew Cash. They also released the album She Comes Into The Room.

In 2013, the band released the five-track EP Angels for the holiday season. A year later, this was expanded to 11 songs and released as a full album. The band are currently signed to Latent Recordings.

On January 1, 2017, Skydiggers were part of CBC's The Strombo Show's Hip 30, where Canadian bands covered songs from The Tragically Hip to commemorate the Hip's 30th anniversary. The band covered the song "The Depression Suite: The Rock". 2017 also saw the release of the Skydiggers latest LP "Warmth of the Sun".

The band is a member of the Canadian charity Artists Against Racism.

Finlayson/Maize
Josh Finlayson and Andy Maize of the Skydiggers have collaborated on a side project of their own named Finlayson/Maize. The duo released their album Dark Hollow under the project name.

Discography

Albums

Singles

Non-album tracks
 "One Day I Walk" (Kick at the Darkness, 1991)
 "Mr. Soul" (Borrowed Tunes: A Tribute to Neil Young, 1994)
 "St. Dunstan's One Request" (Pine Ridge: An Open Letter To Allan Rock/Songs For Leonard Peltier, 1996)
 "All of Our Dreaming" ("Shape of Things to Come" CD single, 1997)
 "Mini-Bar Superstar" ("Shape of Things to Come" CD single, 1997)
 "When You're Down" (Have Not Been the Same: The CanRock Renaissance 1985-1995, 2012)

References

External links
 
  CanConRox bio
 
 

Musical groups established in 1987
Musical groups from Toronto
Canadian folk rock groups
Juno Award for Breakthrough Group of the Year winners
MapleMusic Recordings artists
1987 establishments in Ontario